Vraník is a village and part of Ledečko in Kutná Hora District in the Central Bohemian Region of the Czech Republic. It has about 10 inhabitants.

Sights

In popular culture
A 15th century recreation of the village is featured in the video game Kingdom Come: Deliverance.

References

Neighbourhoods in the Czech Republic
Populated places in Kutná Hora District